Gahnia insignis is a tussock-forming perennial in the family Cyperaceae, that is native to eastern parts of Australia  from south eastern Queensland to north eastern New South Wales.

References

insignis
Plants described in 1957
Flora of Queensland
Flora of New South Wales
Taxa named by Stanley Thatcher Blake